Teinobasis alluaudi is a species of damselfly in family Coenagrionidae. It is found in Kenya, Madagascar, Malawi, Seychelles, and Tanzania. Its natural habitats are subtropical or tropical moist lowland forests and shrub-dominated wetlands. It is threatened by habitat loss.

References 

Coenagrionidae
Insects described in 1896
Taxonomy articles created by Polbot